Fuse FM is a student radio station covering the campuses of the University of Manchester, England, UK, broadcasting throughout the university term online via the station's website from the University of Manchester Students' Union.

Like most student radio stations, it is run entirely by volunteers, mainly from the students studying at the university. The station is a member of The Student Radio Association.

History
The Student Union Executive accepted a proposal to create the station in July 2000 and work began on creating a base for the station, which was originally called Mint FM. The name was changed to Fuse FM in October 2000. Space in the Union basement was converted into a fully functioning broadcast studio and production suite. Fuse FM went on air for the first time on 15 February 2001 at 06:00, broadcasting on 106.2 FM as well as via internet streaming.

Alex James Atkinson was elected as the first Station Manager for the station. Atkinson is now a presenter on the Sony Award nominated show In:Demand, which is broadcast from Key 103 and networked on ten stations across the country.
 
The first song played was R.E.M. - The Great Beyond, and traditionally each broadcast ends with Green Day - Good Riddance (Time of Your Life).

On Monday 9 November 2009, Fuse FM welcomed comedian Jack Whitehall as a one-off presenter. He was welcomed back once again on Wednesday 10 March 2010, taking the place of the station's regular premier show Craig & Jake's Afternoon Delight.

From 2003 to 2011, Fuse FM was broadcast for four weeks in each academic semester (September to October and February to March). However, since September 2011, the station has moved to broadcasting throughout the academic year, from September to June. The station also dispensed with FM broadcasting, with only online streaming via the website now available.

On 29 April 2012, Fuse FM began broadcasting from new state of the art studios on the first floor of the Steve Biko building. With support from the BBC, the Your Manchester Fund and the University of Manchester Students' Union, Fuse FM now has some of the best student radio facilities in the country, including two sets of Studer OnAir 1500 digital sound desks.

On 26 April 2013, Fuse took part in the first ever Manchester Student Media Awards, which was organised by Station Manager Joe Kearney and the then Media Intern. The awards took place in Academy 2 in the Students' Union. Also awarded were the University's student paper, The Mancunion, and the student TV station, Fuse TV. The radio categories were judged by industry professionals, including Ben Newby from Capital FM Manchester. The evening was hosted by Adam Brown, host of weekend breakfast on Capital FM Manchester. After all the awards were presented, there was a sound clash featuring DJs from both Fuse FM and The Hits Radio.

From 11 October 2016, the station began running an event named 'Fuse Live'. Ran by Sophie Nebesniak, Ciaran Algar, Liam Armstrong, Temur Ahmed and Robin Loo, Sonic Bliss Machine, Last Breath and New Luna performed at the first event (held in Academy 3 in the students' union). The event was repeated on 6 December 2016 at the same venue but with different acts. Pareidolia, Cosmo Calling and TAMSYN performed at the second Fuse Live. On 16 March 2017, the third Fuse Live was held in the Fallow Cafe in Fallowfield. The event sold out an hour before headliners, Howl, were due to perform. Other artists that performed that night were singer-songwriter Olly Flavell and jazz-band Top Deck.

As of September 2018, a Sunday afternoon show titled 'The What's on Diary', hosted by Matt Culley and Brandon Ashplant, ran for the academic year 2018-2019. The show promoted cultural events, gigs and shows around Manchester. Following the first semester of promoting a variety of university societies and small-scale events around campus, The What's on Diary got in contact with the organisers of TEDxManchester. The organisers were interviewed on the final show of the first semester, and then invited the presenters to the event in February 2019. With press passes and back stage access Culley and Ashplant interviewed Moon Ribas, Ged King of Skullfades Foundation and Maisie Williams. After an article on the event with exclusive interviews published in The Mancunion, and a 3-part series airing the pre-recorded interviews from the TEDx event on The What's on Diary, the presenters were invited to the 'Literally Fighting Homelessness' event at The Hilton Hotel in Manchester, a boxing match organised by and involving Ged King. King invited the hosts to report on the event, following their coverage of TEDxManchester.

Awards
Fuse FM has a history of high quality student broadcasting, with its DJs having won many awards at the National Student Radio Awards. In 2012, Hattie Pearson won Best Female for her work on Fuse. As part of her prize, Hattie covered an early morning breakfast slot on BBC Radio 1 on Friday 29 March 2013. In 2011, James Robinson received a nomination in the Best Male category. In 2010, Chelsea Dickenson won Best Newcomer, in 2007 Becca Day-Preston won the Bronze Prize for Female Presenter of the Year, Andrew Jackson won Male Presenter of the Year in 2006, while Minnie Stephenson claimed the Female Presenter of the Year award in 2005.

See also
Student Radio Association
Student Radio Awards

References

External links
FuseFM.co.uk
Fuse's Presenter wiki
Fuse FM on Twitter

Radio stations in Manchester
University of Manchester
Student radio in the United Kingdom
Radio stations established in 2001